Storybook Squares was the name given to a special series of episodes of the NBC game show Hollywood Squares. The series featured celebrities dressed up as famous people and characters from history and various forms of media.

Peter Marshall served as host of these episodes. The panelists were introduced by "The Guardian of the Gate", who announced their characters' presence by reading their names from a scroll. The Guardian was played by regular Hollywood Squares announcer Kenny Williams, and the character was similar to his "Town Crier" character from Video Village.

The series ran on NBC on Saturday mornings from January 4 to April 19, 1969, with repeats airing until August 30. The concept was revived during the 1976-1977 season as a series of special theme weeks on the daytime Hollywood Squares.

Format
On the original edition of Storybook Squares, the game was played in the same manner as the regular game, with celebrities in the squares dressed as storybook and nursery rhyme characters. Two children competed, always boy vs. girl with the boy as X and the girl as Circle. They played as many games as time permitted, with a prize being awarded for each win. No money was awarded; a Secret Square game for the first two games was played, with the setup identical to the 1968 primetime game and first two years of the syndicated version—that is, if the first game's Secret Square was not won, the package was combined with that of the second game, and then after that it was not won.

Panelists (1969)

The only panelist from the adult show who played as he normally would was Cliff Arquette, who carried his "Charley Weaver" persona over to Storybook Squares. The other panelists played characters from fairy tales and books, historical figures, or in some cases the characters they played on television.

Unlike the parent series, on Storybook Squares each panelist/character was given an elaborate introduction as they entered the set and took their place on the board, allowing for a brief comic interaction with host Marshall as they did so. Some of the celebrities who appeared were:

 Marty Allen as Tarzan and Cupid
 Jim Backus as Mr. Magoo (animated character for whom he provided the voice) and Thurston Howell III (his character from Gilligan's Island)
 Ted Cassidy as Tarzan
 Charo as Isabella
 Wally Cox as Paul Revere and Davy Crockett
 Bob Crane as Colonel Hogan (his role on Hogan's Heroes)
 Abby Dalton as Little Miss Muffet
 Barbara Eden as Jeannie (her role on I Dream of Jeannie)
 Nanette Fabray as The Old Woman Who Lived in the Shoe 
 Stu Gilliam as Merlin
 Arte Johnson as Wolfgang the Nazi from Rowan & Martin's Laugh-In, referred to herein as the "'Very Interesting' Soldier"
 Paul Lynde as Frankenstein's monster and the Evil Queen from Snow White
 Paul Winchell as Romeo  and Dr. Jekyll (with Tessie Mahoney- Jerry Mahoney in a blond wig- as Juliet and Jerry Mahoney as Mr. Hyde)
 Carolyn Jones as Morticia Addams (her role on The Addams Family)
 Rose Marie as Pocahontas and Annie Oakley
 Roy Rogers and Dale Evans
 Soupy Sales as Henry VIII and Thomas Edison
 William Shatner as James T. Kirk (his character from Star Trek)
 Leslie Uggams as Snow White

1976-1977 return
When the daytime series brought back Storybook Squares, its format was changed slightly. Instead of a two-player match featuring boys playing girls, the matches used a team format with the boys playing with their fathers and grandfathers and the girls with their mothers and grandmothers.

The children played the first game of the match, with the parents playing the second and the grandparents each subsequent game as time permitted. $300 was awarded for each game won, with $50 awarded per square if time was called during a game.

The team with the most money at the end of the game won a large prize, such as a car or exotic vacation.

Panelists (1976–1977)
 Marty Allen as Tarzan
 Milton Berle as Old Mother Hubbard
 Valerie Bertinelli as Little Miss Muffet
 Big Bird (Muppet played by Caroll Spinney)
 Hal Smith as Mother Goose
 Paul Lynde as Attila the Hun, Frankenstein's monster, The Wicked Witch, Davy Crockett, and Paul Bunyan
 William Shatner as Captain Kirk
 Elke Sommer as Guinevere
 Susan Seaforth Hayes as Eve and Cleopatra
 Bill Hayes as Adam and Caesar
 Connie Stevens as The Queen of Hearts
 Karen Valentine as Mona Lisa
 Anson Williams as Simple Simon
 Florence Henderson as Belle Starr
 Doc Severinsen (with his trumpet) as The Pied Piper and Gabriel
 George Gobel as Henry VIII
 Vincent Price as Captain Hook
 Pat Harrington (Jr.) as Leonardo da Vinci
 Rip Taylor as General Custer
 Joan Rivers as The Old Woman Who Lived in the Shoe
 Bonnie Franklin as Goldilocks and Peter Pan
 John Byner as Long John Silver
 Roddy McDowall as Sherlock Holmes and Pinocchio
 Arte Johnson as Beethoven
 Jo Ann Worley as Martha Washington
 Soupy Sales as Thomas Edison
 Rich Little as Noah
 Julie McWhirter(-Dees) as Glinda the Good Witch (though referred to as "the Good Fairy") and Dorothy Gale
 Charo as Lady Godiva (she wore a sparkly flesh-toned bodysuit rather than appear actually nude)

Set
The 1969 set was decked out in a medieval theme for the host and players' podiums, while the gameboard remained the same as on the adult version. The 1970s sets extended the medieval theme to the entire set, with a sweeping castle facade built around and behind the "Squares".

Episode status
The 1969 version's status is unknown. While NBC kept most of its Saturday morning programming, they were also known to wipe episodes of game shows and it is believed that this practice was used on the series. One episode was uploaded to YouTube in December 2016.

The fate of the 1976-77 specials is also unclear as NBC was still employing wiping as a practice at the time. Game Show Network aired a December 1977 episode as part of a Halloween-themed marathon in 2002; it was the only NBC daytime episode to be rerun by GSN. Another episode that originally aired on July 4, 1977 is available on YouTube. A third episode, from 1976, surfaced on YouTube in August 2019.

References

External links

Panel games
NBC original programming
1960s American children's television series
1960s American children's game shows
1969 American television series debuts
1969 American television series endings
1960s American comedy game shows
1970s American comedy game shows
1976 American television series debuts
1977 American television series endings
Television series by Heatter-Quigley Productions
Television series by MGM Television
American television spin-offs
Television shows based on tic-tac-toe
Hollywood Squares